Antihepialus is a genus of moths of the family Hepialidae. There are four described species, found in southern and eastern Africa.

Species 

Antihepialus antarcticus – South Africa
Antihepialus capeneri – South Africa
Antihepialus keniae – Kenya/Uganda
Antihepialus vansoni – South Africa

External links

Hepialidae genera

Hepialidae
Exoporia genera